Sales engineering is a hybrid of sales and engineering that exists in industrial and commercial markets. An engineering degree is not mandatory for a sales engineer, as long as they have sales knowledge and sufficient technical knowledge of the service or product they are called sales engineer. Buying decisions in these markets are made differently than those in many consumer contexts, being based more on technical information and rational analysis and less on style, fashion, or impulse. Therefore, selling in these markets cannot depend on consumer-type sales methods alone, and instead it relies heavily on technical information and problem-solving to convince buyers that they should spend money on the seller's products or services, in order to meet a business need (that is, to satisfy a business case). A sales engineer is thus both "a salesperson that understands and can apply engineering" and "an engineer that understands how to sell engineered systems". They thus not only sell but also provide advice and support. They provide this service to various internal or external customers, and they may work for a manufacturer (servicing its industrial-account/business-to-business customers), for a distributor (which in turn services the industrial-account/business-to-business customers), or for a third party such as an engineering consultancy or a systems integrator.

Sales engineers are a critical sales team member in many companies and industries around the world.  They are more than just technical experts in their respective industries.  Highly successful sales engineers must build and maintain parallel expertise in "soft skill" disciplines such as business acumen, presentation skills, building customer relationships, developing an engagement strategy, and having a thorough understanding of the targeted industry.  Many companies have difficulty finding people who possess these qualities, plus have extensive technical knowledge.

The essence of the sales engineering role can be called by various names. Which name is most apt can even depend on which industry it is used in. Some common job titles that involve the essence of sales engineering include sales engineer, solutions engineer, solutions architect, systems engineer, customer engineer, pre-sales consultant, technical account manager, applications engineer or field applications engineer. The term systems engineering has various shades of meaning, however, as it is often more or less synonymous with industrial engineering; but in any market economy, industrial engineers will often end up providing some sales engineering as a necessary portion of their work. Service technicians in industrial fields may also find that their work challenges them to provide some sales engineering, to whatever extent they are capable of providing it, because they interface with customers having problems with equipment (or lacking the right equipment) and seeking solutions (anywhere from diagnosis and repair, to identifying entirely different systems that could be used instead).

External functions

Sales and consultancy 
The purpose of the job is to help potential customers understand, compare, and contrast the solutions that are available for purchase (the pre-sales role); to troubleshoot problems with their implementations—that is, to help ensure that the solutions work successfully once a purchase is made (the post-sales role); and to maximize sales for the sales engineer's employer by providing help to customers (the aspect of the job that puts the "sales" in the title sales engineer).

Conflict-of-interest management and return-on-investment demonstration
It is understood in the market, by both the sales engineer and his or her wary industrial client, that the sales portion of the sales engineering role inherently involves a conflict of interest (COI), because it is always possible that the ideal solutions could involve recommending a competitor's products or services. However, the sales engineer is under pressure to steer the customer towards their employer's product. Thus, customers are generally wary of advice given by sales engineers. Nevertheless, sales engineers do usually provide real value to customers, which is why the role endures despite customers' apprehension. The customer's only motivation to participate in the encounter is to achieve return on investment (ROI) in one way or another. Toward that end, sales engineering increasingly relies on any information technology that can help quantify ROI. This is summed up in the aphorism that "at the end of the day, the customer just wants to know for sure that they will gain A dollars over the next B years (via reduced expenses or increased sales) if they pay C dollars up front for product D."

Application development 
Another function of the sales engineer is to introduce modified, improved, and/or advanced technology to potential users who may have an application but who have not yet acquired knowledge of the material or technique in question. The sales engineer may conduct training sessions or demonstrations to accomplish this. The task of seeking out industries, firms, or business models that do not yet use a certain product (for example, a CAx system or a CRM system) and causing them to adopt a new approach using that product is what puts the "applications" in "applications engineering" or "application development" (not to be confused with another common sense of that term, which refers to software development and programming). The task is to seek out and develop new applications for the product, in order to increase sales. The customer's only motivation for adopting it is "what it can do for me", such as same-output-lower-costs, more-output-same-cost, etc. Thus, when things work out correctly, both firms profit from the application development.

This result also has broader economic implications, as it is a mechanism by which economic efficiency increases, productivity grows, and economic growth is encouraged. Inventors and R&D people create new tools and processes; but they do not disseminate into the business world (to do any economic good) without some amount of applications development, teaching (from exposing decision-makers via trade shows to providing workers with training), and sales.

Teaching customers 
Many products and services purchased by large companies and institutions are highly complex. Examples include airliners, weapons systems, and IT systems (such as telecommunications, or databases and their dependent applications for purposes such as logistics or customer relationship management). Sales engineers advise customers on how best to use the products or services provided.

The sales process also may require some technical proof of concept or tech demo to be assured of the practicality of the solution.  Sales engineers normally will ensure these efforts are successful.

Internal Functions

Proposal preparation 
The sales of systems and solutions delivered by these companies are complex and usually require extensive documentation that describes what is being proposed and what the company commits to deliver. The sales engineer is in charge of preparing technical proposals, or scopes of work (SoWs), which are usually subject to technical negotiation with the customer prior to the provider being able to submit a commercial proposal. In order to prepare the commercial proposal, once the scope of the proposed solution is finalized, the sales engineer is typically also in charge of gathering all the inputs from internal stakeholders (product, R&D, delivery, services, finance, legal, etc.) so that profit and loss (P&L) can be calculated, pricing can be established and final commercial proposal can be approved and submitted to the customer.

Tailoring of solutions 
Sales engineers also collaborate with the design, production, engineering, or R&D departments of their companies to determine how products and services could be made or modified to suit customers' needs. This aspect of sales engineering is important, because it is what allows the sales engineer to feel that they can maintain their personal integrity (ethically speaking) in the face of the inherent COI of the job (explained earlier). The sales engineer does not have to lie (ignore or negatively misrepresent the competitor's products or services) if they can reasonably tell the customer that their employer can tailor its solutions to the customer's particular requirements. Doing that may not be easy or cheap, which means that there is always a line to be walked to avoid overpromising-and/or-underdelivering.

Personnel considerations

Talents, skills, knowledge 
The companies that employ sales engineers need to sell their products or services to generate income, but since engineers and scientists usually have substantially different personality traits than those required for sales work, there is a role for people with a combination of abilities. These individuals must have technical understanding of the complexities of what their company supplies together with sales skills. This combination of traits is not common.

Travel, communications, telepresence, compensation 
Sales engineers may spend 20% to 70% of their time traveling, and they may work a flexible schedule due to the needs of the sales organization they support. Most sales engineers telecommute or spend a limited amount of time in the office. Skills with IT that help remote people communicate better, such as teleconferencing, videoconferencing, web conferencing, and telepresence (e.g., GoToMeeting, WebEx, live meeting, Fuze Meeting) are put to good use both on and off the road.

Sales engineers, like their sales representative counterparts, are hired based on their geographic location rather than their proximity to the corporate, or even regional, office. Working in another part of the country, or even outside the country, where the corporate offices are, a sales engineer may only make it to corporate headquarters once or twice each year.

A key differentiator between sales engineers and other roles within the organization is that a sales engineer is usually compensated by salary plus commission, as most sales representatives are. This commission is usually paid out when the sales representative is paid. Far less common is the case where a sales engineer is compensated with a base salary plus bonus. The bonus can be based upon the revenue generated within an assigned territory, set up as a management by objectives (MBO) bonus, or a combination of the two. In both cases a sales engineer will make a base salary that is proportionally higher than their sales representative counterparts, and significantly more than the traditional engineers in an organization.

Sales engineering resources 
Sales engineering is often different from traditional sales roles. The systems, products, and technology that a sales engineer sells are often complex and expensive. Traditional sales strategies, especially "hard closing" techniques, may not work and in some cases can even hurt a sale. As technology advances, so must the sales strategy of a sales engineer. The North American Association of Sales Engineers has done much to advance awareness of the field across all industries and has further resources available.

Consultative approach 
Sales engineers and technical sales reps must perfectly understand the product or service they are selling; they should be able to explain in detail how it works, what business value it offers, and the results that customers will achieve. They also have to sell the idea of why customers need to make a change to move forward to the solution offered. Sales engineering uses a lot of discovery questions to uncover the challenges that customers have in their business or the outcomes they can't drive.

References

External links
 United States Department of Labor Occupational Outlook Handbook, 2008-09 Edition
 Field Application Engineer's Job Profile
 Seviour, Robert. Can an engineer make a good sales professional?

Sales occupations
Engineering occupations